Ronco Canavese is a comune (municipality) in the Metropolitan City of Turin in the Italian region Piedmont, located about  north of Turin.

Ronco is at the center of Valle Soana, on the left bank of the river, overlooking the  valley surrounded by dense forests.

Ronco Canavese borders the following municipalities: Cogne, Valprato Soana, Traversella, Locana, Ingria, Ribordone, Pont Canavese, Convento, Bosco, and Sparone.

Ronco Canavese and surrounding villages fell victim to floods as the Valle Soana river burst its banks.

French is widely spoken in the town and neighbouring villages as numerous French have holiday homes in Ronco Canavese and surrounding villages. The majority of tourists arrive in July and August to celebrate the festivities.

References

External links
http://www.vallesoana.it

Cities and towns in Piedmont
Canavese